Plinia phitrantha, commonly known as  (white jaboticaba) or ibatinga  (Tupi-Guarani for white fruit), is a species of plant in the family Myrtaceae. It is endemic to the states of São Paulo and Minas Gerais in south-eastern Brazil. The tree grows to between 2 and 7 metres tall, and produces edible fruit, between 10 and 25mm in diameter, which is green in colour due to a lack of anthocyanins in the skin.

References

phitrantha
Crops originating from the Americas
Crops originating from Brazil
Tropical fruit
Endemic flora of Brazil
Fruits originating in South America
Cauliflory
Fruit trees
Berries
Plants described in 1994